Robert Torrez Griffin (born November 22, 1989) is a former American football offensive guard. He was selected by the New York Jets in the sixth round, 203rd overall, in the 2012 NFL Draft. He played college football at Baylor University.

College career
Griffin attended Navarro College immediately after graduating from high school, before transferring to Baylor in 2010. When he arrived the more famous Robert Griffin III was already on the roster. Sharing the same name as the quarterback brought Griffin some notoriety before the draft.

Professional career

New York Jets
The New York Jets drafted Griffin using their sixth round selection in the 2012 NFL Draft. Griffin signed a four-year contract on May 15, 2012. On August 31, 2012, Griffin was waived.

Indianapolis Colts
Griffin was signed to the Indianapolis Colts' practice squad on December 12, 2012. He was released on December 18, 2012. Griffin was signed to a reserve/future contract on January 1, 2013. Griffin was waived by the Colts on August 1, 2013.

References

External links
 
 New York Jets bio
 Baylor Bears bio

Living people
1989 births
People from Euless, Texas
American football offensive guards
Navarro Bulldogs football players
Baylor Bears football players
New York Jets players
Indianapolis Colts players
Mesquite Marshals players
Texas Revolution players